Quigley is an unincorporated community in Granite County, Montana, United States, located  south-east of Missoula. The community is serviced by the post office in Clinton.

External links 

 Quigley on Google Maps

Unincorporated communities in Granite County, Montana